Vivian Bonnell (born Enid Mosier, May 23, 1924 – November 18, 2003) was an actress and calypso singer, originally from Antigua, British West Indies. In 1954, she starred opposite Pearl Bailey in the Broadway musical House of Flowers. She and her fellow cast members recorded calypso albums as "Enid Mosier and her Trinidad Steel Band". She later married one of those performers, Austin Stoker.

After changing her name, Bonnell went on to appear in a number of films and television shows, including several American TV movies. She died of complications from diabetes in Los Angeles on November 18, 2003, at the age of 79.

Filmography

Film

Television

References

External links
 
 
 
 
 
 

1924 births
2003 deaths
American film actresses
American television actresses
Antigua and Barbuda emigrants to the United States
Deaths from diabetes
20th-century American singers
20th-century American women singers
20th-century American actresses
21st-century American women